Secret Millionaires Club is an American educational animated series that aired on The Hub / Hub Network from October 23, 2011 to January 11, 2017 (Qubo telecast only). The series features famed investor Warren Buffett as a secret mentor to a group of teens who learn practical life lessons during fun-filled adventures in business.

Plot
The series follows adventures in business with Radley, Elena, Jones, Lisa, their robot Starty, and Warren Buffett as their wise mentor. Every episode focuses on different business situations that kids might encounter in their own lives like having to raise money for something they want, or helping a local merchant understand why their business isn't working. The teens are smart and enterprising, and come to realize that the best investment they can make is an investment in themselves.

Characters
 Warren Buffett (voiced by himself, Guy Pinkham and Kevin Brief; varies in different episodes) is a millionaire who serves as the wise mentor of Elena, Jones, Radley, and Lisa.
 Elena Ramirez (voiced by Julie Maddalena) is an eternal optimist with an upbeat personality who takes a positive approach to life. In her brown eyes, the world is neither black nor white but awash in many shades. Her thinking is smart and concise. She is the swing vote between Jones and Radley when neither can see the others' point of view. If Elena were a stockbroker, she'd be both a bull and a bear depending on market conditions.
 David Allan Jones (voiced by Steve Staley) is funny, loud, the daredevil of the group, and a sports fanatic. In fact, his clothing attire usually has one piece of sporting equipment attached to one of his hands. He's a risk-taker and his impulsiveness often gets him into trouble. If the world is a chess game, Jones is off playing checkers. He rarely looks before he leaps nor does he usually think ahead to examine the consequences of his actions. His friends have to do that for him.
 Radley Hemming (voiced by Ogie Banks) is all intellectual, a "techie" supreme, the kid who would shower with his computer if he could. Conservative in nature, he balances his emotions with a practical and well thought out approach to life. He never makes a move without first examining every possible result. His slow and methodical deliberations drives Jones to distraction. In the world of investing, they make a winning pair, Elena has a small crush on him in some episodes.
 Starty (voiced by Chris Jai Alex) is Radley's robot.
 D.E.B. (voiced by Debbie Bosanek) is an application that is on Radley's tablet computer. Radley would often consult D.E.B. about any word definitions.
 Hou "Lisa" Lihua (voiced by Stephanie Sheh) is a Beijing student who never leaves without her French purse. Lisa would do nearly almost anything to join the United Nations.
 Jay-Z, Nick Cannon, Shaquille O'Neal and Bill Gates as themselves

Episodes

References

External links
 Secret Millionaires Club at Internet Movie Database

2010s American animated television series
2011 American television series debuts
2017 American television series endings
American children's animated adventure television series
American children's animated education television series
American flash animated television series
Discovery Family original programming
English-language television shows
Teen animated television series
Television shows set in the United States